Drizzle is a light liquid precipitation.

Drizzle may also refer to:
Drizzle (image processing), a digital image processing method
Drizzle (database server), a database management system